Annie E. Anderson Walker (née Annie E. Anderson) (October 5, 1855 – June 9, 1929) was an African-American artist, known for her portraits, her work in pastels and for being one of the first African-American women to complete an institutional art education in the United States and exhibit at the Paris Salon.

Biography

Born in Flatbush, Brooklyn, on October 5, 1855 to Nancy Cassidy and Francis Anderson, Walker was the youngest of five children. She entered the teaching profession at an early age, teaching in Jacksonville, Florida and Orrville, Alabama.  After passing examinations before the Selma Board of Education, she was appointed a teacher in the Burwell Academy in Selma where she taught for several years. In 1875 she married Selma lawyer Thomas Walker in Dallas, Alabama. In 1890 she moved to Washington, DC and began private lessons in drawing and painting.  After a year of  private lessons Walker was admitted to the Corcoran School of Art, but was refused entry when it was discovered that she was black.  When she appeared at the Corcoran, she was told by the admitting instructor that "...the trustees have directed me not to admit colored people. If we had known that you were colored, the committee would not have examined your work."  Walker was acquainted with abolitionist Frederick Douglass, and he wrote a powerful appeal to the administration on her behalf asking them to " ...reconsider this exclusion and admit Mrs. Walker to the Corcoran Gallery of Art, and thus remove a hardship and redress a grievous wrong imposed upon a person guilty of no crime and one in every way qualified to compete with others in the refining and ennobling study of art..."   His appeal and others, however, drew no positive response and her rejection was not reversed.

Within months of her rejection by the Corcoran Gallery of Art, Walker traveled to New York City to apply at the Cooper Union for the Advancement of Science and Art.

Susan N. Carter, Principal of the Women's Art School at the Cooper Union in 1892, related this about Walker: "A young colored woman came to the Cooper Union a few months ago. She was most ladylike and prepossessing in appearance. She brought with her a roll of drawings, on which she had been admitted to the Art School of the Corcoran Gallery in Washington. When she presented herself at that school, she was refused a place there, on the ground of her color solely. She showed me long letters from Frederick Douglas and others, protesting against such an injustice; but the decision against her was not changed. Knowing of the Cooper Institute, she came to New York to see about entering here. Recognizing the wrong done to her race in her exclusion from a school in the Capitol city of our country, twenty-seven years after our war was over, I felt that I was honoring New York City, as well as the dear memory of Mr. Cooper, if I let her at once have a place in my own office (as the class-rooms were full), till a vacancy should occur in the drawing-class room. This young colored girl is doing exceptionally well, and the kindness of her teacher and companions has helped to soothe her former grief."Walker studied at the Cooper Union from 1892 to 1895 and was a pupil of Thomas Eakins and John Henry Twachtman.

Upon Walker's graduation in 1895,  Susan N. Carter detailed her success at the school:"It may be remembered that three years ago a colored woman from Washington, D.C., was admitted to the Woman's Art School. Mrs. Annie E. A. Walker is her name. Coming to the Cooper Union she was received here, where Mr. Peter Cooper's free gift of instruction makes no distinction of race or nationality. Mrs. Walker has been a very satisfactory scholar and now graduates. She has earned and saved more than $600 since she entered the Cooper Union, and will use this money for a year's study in Paris, after which she proposes to open a studio for portrait painting. The energy, ability and fine character of this colored woman are very encouraging, as showing the possibilities of her race."

After graduating in 1895, Walker sailed to Paris in September where she studied at the prestigious Académie Julian, likely the first African-American woman to do so. She was honored by being chosen to exhibit her work at the 1896 Paris Salon, the official juried art exhibition of the Académie des Beaux-Arts in Paris. The work exhibited was a pastel drawing entitled La Parisienne, a portrait of a woman now in the collection of Howard University. 
After her studies, Walker traveled to London, Switzerland, and Italy. Walker returned to the United States in December 1896, where she settled in Washington, D.C. She continued to paint and draw while balancing her responsibilities as the wife of a successful lawyer.  However, two years after returning from Paris, Walker suffered a nervous breakdown, possibly due to the strain of societal pressure and expectations, and ceased her artistic work, remaining an invalid, homebound, until her death in 1929 in Washington, D.C.

Although Walker's promising career was tragically short, she was noted especially for her pastels, which were compared with those of Alice Pike Barney, and which were shown at Howard University. Art historian Tritobia Hayes Benjamin noted Walker's "..tireless courage, determination, and persistence in becoming an artist in the face of racism and sexism..."  She describes Walker's work as "...academic in style and execution, and illustrates an active intuitive ability and spirit, as well as a masterful control of the medium."   Walker died on June 9, 1929 at the age of 73 and was buried in Harmony Cemetery in Washington DC.

Exhibitions 
 1896 Annual Paris Salon, Paris France

References

1855 births
1929 deaths
American portrait painters
Pastel artists
African-American women artists
American women painters
Académie Julian alumni
Cooper Union alumni
Artists from Brooklyn
Painters from New York City
Painters from Washington, D.C.
People from Flatbush, Brooklyn
19th-century American painters
20th-century American painters
19th-century American women artists
20th-century American women artists
Students of Thomas Eakins
African-American painters
Burials at Columbian Harmony Cemetery